St Patrick's Church is a Roman Catholic church in Bradford, West Yorkshire, England. It was built from 1852 to 1853 and designed by George Goldie. It is situated on the corner of Sedgfield Terrace and Westgate in the city centre. To the south and west of the church is Rebecca Street and Vaughan Street. The church is the oldest Roman Catholic church still in use in the city and is a Grade II listed building.

History

Foundation
In 1825, the original St Mary's Church was the first Roman Catholic church to be built in Bradford after the reformation. It was rebuilt from 1874 to 1876, but closed in 2008.

St Patrick's Church was founded by Canon Thomas Harrison who was priest at St Mary's Church. In 1850, he went about buying the site for St Patrick's Church. He had to buy the land through an intermediary because of the anti-Catholic sentiment in the city.

Construction
In 1852, building work started on the church. It was designed by George Goldie. On 13 July 1853, the church was opened by the Bishop of Beverley, John Briggs. In 1855, it became its own parish.

In the 1860s, the interior decoration of the church was completed. In 1866, a neighbouring presbytery was built and in 1869 a south porch was added to the church. In 1903, the church was consecrated.

Developments 
Between 1968 and 1972, following the Second Vatican Council, the interior was reordered.

Next door to the church is St Pio Friary, where the Franciscan Friars of the Renewal are based. They serve the congregation of St Patrick's Church and operate a local soup kitchen.

Parish

St Joseph's Church
Since 2009, St Patrick's Church has been a Mission church in the parish of St Joseph, centred at St Joseph's Church, which is on the corner of Pakington Street and Manchester Road. It is a Grade II listed building and was designed by Edward Simpson. Construction on the church began in 1885. It was opened on 14 September 1887. The church was consecrated on 14 September 1937. It cost approximately £7,000. In the 1930s, internal alterations were made by the architect J. H. Langtry-Langton. In 1964, the church was extended under the supervision of his son, Peter Langtry-Langton. On 24 September 2009, the Shrine of the Annunciation of Our Lady of Bradford was established in the church. In 2016, the church became a centre for the saying of the Tridentine Mass in the area.

Mass
There are no Sunday Mass at St Patrick's Church. Instead there is a 12:15 pm Mass every weekday, Monday to Saturday, preceded by one hour of Exposition of the Blessed Sacrament. At St Joseph's Church there are three Sunday Masses: 5:00 pm on Saturday and 10:00 am and 6:00 pm on Sunday.

See also
 Roman Catholic Diocese of Leeds
 Listed buildings in Bradford (City Ward)

References

External links
 
 
 St Joseph's Parish site

Roman Catholic churches in West Yorkshire
Saint Patrick
Grade II listed churches in West Yorkshire
Grade II listed Roman Catholic churches in England
Gothic Revival church buildings in England
Roman Catholic churches completed in 1853
Gothic Revival architecture in West Yorkshire
Roman Catholic Diocese of Leeds
George Goldie church buildings
19th-century Roman Catholic church buildings in the United Kingdom
Franciscan Friars of the Renewal